Poddubye is a rural locality (a village) in Yershovskoye Rural Settlement, Sheksninsky District, Vologda Oblast, Russia. The population was 14 as of 2002.

Geography 
Poddubye is located 25 km north of Sheksna (the district's administrative centre) by road. Potanino is the nearest rural locality.

References 

Rural localities in Sheksninsky District